Planina pri Raki is a small settlement in the hills north of Raka in the Municipality of Krško in eastern Slovenia. The area is part of the traditional region of Lower Carniola. It is now included with the rest of the municipality in the Lower Sava Statistical Region.

Name
The name of the settlement was changed from Planina to Planina pri Raki in 1953.

References

External links
Planina pri Raki on Geopedia

Populated places in the Municipality of Krško